Olcay is a common unisex Turkish given name. In Turkish, "Olcay" means "Luck", and/or "Lucky".

People named Olcay include:

 Ayşe Olcay Tiryaki, a Turkish physician.
 Olcay Çakır, a Turkish female basketball player who plays for Fenerbahçe İstanbul 
 Olcay Gulsen, Dutch fashion designer. She is owner of the SuperTrash fashion label.
 Olcay Neyzi, Turkish doctor. She greatly contributed to improving the level of medical education in Turkey.
 Olcay Şahan, Turkish male footballer.
 Olcay Çetinkaya, a Turkish male professional footballer.

Turkish given names
Turkish unisex given names